Roy David McMillan (July 17, 1929 – November 2, 1997) was a shortstop, coach and manager in Major League Baseball. From 1951 through 1966, McMillan played for the Cincinnati Reds, Milwaukee Braves, and New York Mets. He batted and threw right-handed. Following his retirement as a player, McMillan managed the Milwaukee Brewers and New York Mets.

Early life
He was born in Bonham, Texas and attended Bonham High School.

Playing career
McMillan, who spent 10 seasons with the Cincinnati Reds, was his team's glue between the infield and outfield in the 1950s. Once dubbed "Mr. Shortstop", he won the first three Gold Gloves for the shortstop position (1957 in MLB, 1958-59 in the National League).  In 1954, he set a since-surpassed major league record of 129 double plays. 

In 1957, McMillan and six of his Redleg teammates—Ed Bailey, Johnny Temple, Don Hoak, Gus Bell, Wally Post and Frank Robinson—were voted into the National League All-Star starting lineup, the result of a ballot stuffing campaign by Reds fans. Bell remained on the team as a reserve, but Post was taken off altogether. Bell and Post were replaced as starters by Hank Aaron and Willie Mays. The Reds managed to assemble a respectable team after a middling decade that meant a run to the World Series in 1961, but McMillan was not to be part of it. He was traded on December 15, 1960 to the Milwaukee Braves for Joey Jay (who won 20 games in two straight seasons) and Juan Pizarro.

McMillan also played with the Milwaukee Braves and New York Mets and finished his career in 1966. Dubiously, with 2,093 games played, McMillan is one of fourteen players to have played over two thousand games without ever reaching the postseason (the closest he came was with the 1956 season, where they finished two games out of a pennant).

Statistics
In a 16-season career, McMillan posted a .243 batting average with 68 home runs and 594 runs batted in in 2,093 games played.

Post playing career
In 1970 he returned to Milwaukee as first-base coach with the Brewers, served as interim skipper in 1972 between Dave Bristol and Del Crandall, then coached for the New York Mets. In 1975, he replaced Yogi Berra as the Mets' interim manager. Late in his career, he was a scout for the Montreal Expos based in Bonham.

McMillan was inducted into the Cincinnati Reds Hall of Fame in 1971 and was subsequently inducted into the Texas Baseball Hall of Fame and the Ohio Baseball Hall of Fame.

McMillan died on November 2, 1997 at the age of 68, having collapsed in his kitchen.  He was survived by his wife of 45 years along with two children and three grandchildren.

References

External links

1929 births
1997 deaths
Ballinger Cats players
Baseball players from Texas
Cincinnati Redlegs players
Cincinnati Reds players
Columbia Reds players
Gold Glove Award winners
Major League Baseball first base coaches
Major League Baseball shortstops
Milwaukee Braves players
Milwaukee Brewers coaches
Milwaukee Brewers managers
Montreal Expos scouts
National League All-Stars
New York Mets coaches
New York Mets managers
New York Mets players
People from Bonham, Texas
Tulsa Oilers (baseball) players
Tyler Trojans players